Betonica is a genus of the plants in the family Lamiaceae.

Species
Species include:
 Betonica alopecuros L.
 Betonica betoniciflora (Rupr. ex O.Fedtsch. & B.Fedtsch.) Sennikov
 Betonica brantii (Benth.) Boiss.
 Betonica bulgarica Degen & Nejceff
 Betonica hirsuta L.
 Betonica macrantha K.Koch
 Betonica nivea Steven
 Betonica officinalis L.
 Betonica orientalis L.
 Betonica scardica Griseb.

References

Lamiaceae
Lamiaceae genera